4432 McGraw-Hill, provisional designation , is a background asteroid from the inner regions of the asteroid belt, approximately  in diameter. It was discovered on 2 March 1981, by American astronomer Schelte Bus at the Siding Spring Observatory in Australia. The likely S-type asteroid was named for the McGraw-Hill Telescope located at Kitt Peak, Arizona.

Orbit and classification 

McGraw-Hill is a non-family asteroid from the main belt's background population. It orbits the Sun in the inner asteroid belt at a distance of 1.9–2.9 AU once every 3 years and 8 months (1,346 days; semi-major axis of 2.39 AU). Its orbit has an eccentricity of 0.21 and an inclination of 0° with respect to the ecliptic.

The body's observation arc begins with a precovery taken at Palomar Observatory in February 1977, or four years prior to its official discovery observation at Siding Spring.

Physical characteristics 

McGraw-Hill is an assumed, stony S-type asteroid, in agreement with the albedo (see below) obtained by the Wide-field Infrared Survey Explorer (WISE).

Rotation period 

During the Small Main-Belt Asteroid Lightcurve Survey, McGraw-Hill has been observed photometrically. The observations gave a small brightness variation of 0.06 magnitude but resulted in no useful rotational lightcurve. As of 2018, the body's rotation period, pole and shape remain unknown.

Diameter and albedo 

According to the survey carried out by the NEOWISE mission of NASA's WISE telescope, McGraw-Hill measures 3.042 kilometers in diameter and its surface has an albedo of 0.254, while the Collaborative Asteroid Lightcurve Link assumes a standard albedo for a stony asteroid of 0.20 and derives a diameter of 3.43 kilometers based on an absolute magnitude of 14.69.

Naming 

This minor planet was named after the 1.3-meter McGraw-Hill Telescope located at the MDM Observatory at the Kitt Peak National Observatory site in Arizona, United States. The official naming citation was published by the Minor Planet Center on 18 February 1992.

References

External links 
 Asteroid Lightcurve Database (LCDB), query form (info )
 Dictionary of Minor Planet Names, Google books
 Discovery Circumstances: Numbered Minor Planets (1)-(5000) – Minor Planet Center
 
 

004432
Discoveries by Schelte J. Bus
Named minor planets
19810302